Great Island Power Station is a gas fired and former heavy fuel oil fired power station situated near Waterford Harbour in Great Island, County Wexford, Ireland, that supplies electricity to more than 500,000 Irish homes. It is located at the confluence of the rivers Barrow and Suir, near Campile. The station opened in 1967 and was operated by the Electricity Supply Board (ESB) with three heavy fuel oil units and a total power of  since 1972. The station was scheduled to close by 2010, until it was sold to Endesa in January 2009. In October 2012, the plant was acquired by SSE Thermal.

In September 2014, the oil powered units were shut down, and replaced by a new  combined cycle gas turbine (CCGT) gas fired plant on the same site.

References

External links

 SSE Thermal: Great Island Power Plant

Natural gas-fired power stations in the Republic of Ireland